1895–96 Hongkong Football Cup was the inaugural season of the Hongkong Football Cup, which is now known as Hong Kong Senior Shield.

The holder of the cup this season was Kowloon Football Club.

Unknown round

Final

References

1895-96
1895–96 domestic association football cups
1895 in Hong Kong
1896 in Hong Kong